Slovenia first competed at the Deaflympics for the first time in 1993. Since then, Slovenia has been regularly participating in the Summer Deaflympics. Slovenia won its first Deaflympic medal in the 1993 Summer Deaflympics.

Slovenia has been competing at the Winter Deaflympics since 1995 and won its first Winter Deaflympic medal also during the Winter Deaflympic event.

Medal tallies

Summer Deaflympics

Winter Deaflympics

See also 
 Slovenia at the Olympics
 Slovenia at the Paralympics

References 

 
Nations at the Deaflympics
Parasports in Slovenia